Çakallı can refer to:

 Çakallı, Bismil
 Çakallı, Karaisalı